Club Fútbol Femenino Ñañas is a women's football club based in Quito, Ecuador that competes in the Superliga Femenina.

History
 founded Club Ñañas on 1 February, 2016.

References

External links
  

Women's football clubs in Ecuador
Football clubs in Ecuador
Association football clubs established in 2016
2016 establishments in Ecuador